Nagodi is a village in Shimoga district, Karnataka, India. It is located 14 km from Kollur towards Shimoga and village is situated at the base of  Kodachadri hills. The 360 degree is greenery view.

References 

Villages in Udupi district